Fabulous 30: The Series (The Series) is a 2017–2018 Thai television series adaptation of the 2011 film with the same title, starring Preechaya Pongthananikorn (Ice) and Tanutchai Wijitwongthong (Mond).

Produced by GMMTV, the series premiered on One31 and LINE TV on 20 November 2017, airing on Mondays at 22:00 ICT and 23:00 ICT, respectively. The series concluded on 12 February 2018 and was rerun on GMM 25 last 2019.

Cast and characters 
Below are the cast of the series:

Main 
 Preechaya Pongthananikorn (Ice) as Ja
 Tanutchai Wijitwongthong (Mond) as Por

Supporting 
 Kawee Tanjararak (Beam) as Captain Nop
 Jumpol Adulkittiporn (Off) as Zen
 Seo Ji Yeon as Ann
 Savitree Suttichanond (Beau) as Cee
 Leo Saussay as Shiro
 Ployshompoo Supasap (Jan) as Gift
 Wichayanee Pearklin (Gam) as Yui
 Panyawong Ornanong as Ja's mother

Guest role 
 Worrawech Danuwong (Dan)
 Siwaj Sawatmaneekul (New)

Soundtracks

References

External links 
 Fabulous 30: The Series on GMM 25 website 
 Fabulous 30: The Series  on LINE TV
 GMMTV

Television series by GMMTV
Thai romantic comedy television series
Thai drama television series
2017 Thai television series debuts
2018 Thai television series endings
One 31 original programming